Geoff Mackley is a freelance photographer who is also specialized in filming breaking news. Known for chasing storms around the world, he was featured in the TV series Dangerman, made for the Discovery Channel. Mackley was born in Christchurch, New Zealand but now resides in Auckland, New Zealand.

References

Living people
Year of birth missing (living people)
New Zealand photographers
Photographers from Auckland